Arthur Brian Erby (27 September 1902 – 3 March 1972) was a rugby union player who represented Australia.

Erby, a prop, was born in Sydney and claimed a total of 5 international rugby caps for Australia.

References

Australian rugby union players
Australia international rugby union players
1902 births
1972 deaths
Rugby union players from Sydney
Rugby union props